Neal A. "Chief" McCaleb (born 1935) is an American civil engineer and Republican politician from Oklahoma. A member of the Chickasaw Nation, McCaleb served in several positions in the Oklahoma state government and then as the Assistant Secretary of the Interior for Indian Affairs under President George W. Bush.

Early life
Born in Oklahoma City, Oklahoma, McCaleb graduated from Putnam City High School in 1953 and received bachelor's degree in Civil Engineering from Oklahoma State University (then known as Oklahoma A&M College) in 1957. Prior to entering politics, McCaleb was a practicing civil engineer. In 1975, McCaleb was named the charter Chairman of the American Indian Council of Architects and Engineers.

Oklahoma politics

State Legislature
McCaleb was elected as a Republican to the Oklahoma House of Representatives in 1974. He remained in the House until 1983. In 1978, McCaleb's colleagues elected him House Minority Leader. He remained in that position until his retirement from the Legislature.

Bellmon Administration
Governor of Oklahoma Henry Bellmon appointed McCaleb to serve as the State's first Secretary of Transportation. The post was created following the passage of the Executive Branch Reform Act of 1986. In addition to his service as Secretary, Bellmon appointed him to serve concurrently as Director of the Oklahoma Department of Transportation. McCaleb served in both positions until the end of Bellmon's term in 1991.

Oklahoma Good Roads Association
Following the end of Bellmon's term, McCaleb became the President of the Oklahoma Good Roads and Transportation Association, a lobbying group dedicated to advocating safe, efficient and affordable state streets, roads and highways. He served as president until 1995.

Keating Administration
In 1995, incumbent Governor of Oklahoma David Walters choose not to seek re-election as Governor. Republican Frank Keating was elected to succeed him in that position. Keating appointed McCaleb to serve as his Secretary of Transportation. Additionally, Keating appointed McCaleb as the head of both the Oklahoma Department of Transportation and the Oklahoma Turnpike Authority.

McCaleb remained in all three positions until July 2001 when he resigned to take a federal government job. Keating appointed Herschal Crow of Tulsa to succeed him as Secretary.

George W. Bush Administration
As a member of the Chickasaw Nation, McCaleb was appointed by Republican President George W. Bush in 2001 to be the Assistant Secretary of the Interior for Indian Affairs in the Department of the Interior, reporting directly to Secretary of the Interior Gale Norton.

McCaleb remained in that position until 2002, when he returned home to Oklahoma.

Chickasaw national service
After leaving federal government service, McCaleb began work as advisor to Bill Anoatubby, Governor of the Chickasaw Nation. McCaleb has been tasked by Governor Anoatubby with the development of long-term economic development plans and policy. Governor Anoatubby appointed McCaleb to the board of directors of Chickasaw Community Bank (formerly Bank 2), a financial industry firm completely owned by the Chickasaw Nation. Governor Anoatubby also made McCaleb the chairman of the board for Chickasaw Nation Industries, a wholly owned subentity of the Nation responsible for promoting economic development for the tribe.

Personal life
McCaleb is married to his wife Georgann and together they have four children and twelve grandchildren.

References

External links
Chickasaw Nations Industries Board of Directors
Neal McCaleb Profile and Videos - Chickasaw.TV
 Voices of Oklahoma interview. First person interview conducted on September 22, 2011, with Neal McCaleb.

1935 births
Living people
20th-century Native American politicians
21st-century Native American politicians
George W. Bush administration personnel
Heads of Oklahoma state agencies
Republican Party members of the Oklahoma House of Representatives
Native American leaders
Chickasaw Nation state legislators in Oklahoma
State cabinet secretaries of Oklahoma
United States Bureau of Indian Affairs personnel